Sandhill wattle is a common name for several flowering plants and may refer to:

Acacia burkittii
Acacia dictyophleba
Acacia ligulata, native to Australia